The Ministry of Agriculture and Food Security, abbreviated MAFS, is a ministry of the Government of Malaysia that is responsible for agriculture, agro-based industry, agritourism, livestock, veterinary services, fisheries, quarantine, inspection, agricultural research, agricultural development, agricultural marketing, pineapple industry, agribusiness, botanical garden, food security, food sovereignty.

Organisation
Minister of Agriculture and Food Security
Deputy Minister
Second Deputy Minister
Secretary-General
Under the Authority of Secretary-General 
Legal Advisor Office
Corporate Communication Unit
Internal Audit Unit
Integrity Unit
Key Performance Indicator Unit
Deputy Secretary-General (Development)
Crops, Livestock and Fishery Industry Division
Paddy and Rice Industry Division
Agro-based Industry Division
Development Division
Agriculture Drainage and Irrigation Division 
Deputy Secretary-General (Planning)
Policy and Strategic Planning Division
National Agriculture Training Council
International Division
Marketing and Export Division
Young Agropreneur Unit
Senior Under-Secretary (Management)
Human Resource Management Division
Finance Division
Account Division
Information Management Division
Administration Division

Federal departments
 Department of Agriculture Malaysia (DoA), or Jabatan Pertanian Malaysia. (Official site)
 Department of Veterinary Services (DVS), or Jabatan Perkhidmatan Veterinar. (Official site)
 Department of Fisheries Malaysia (DoF), or Jabatan Perikanan Malaysia. (Official site)
 Malaysian Quarantine and Inspection Services Department (MAQIS), or Jabatan Perkhidmatan Kuarantin dan Pemeriksaan Malaysia. (Official site)

Federal agencies
 Malaysian Agricultural Research and Development Institute (MARDI), or Institut Penyelidikan dan Kemajuan Pertanian Malaysia. (Official site)
 Farmers' Organization Authority (FOA), or Lembaga Pertubuhan Peladang (LPP). (Official site)
 Federal Agricultural Marketing Authority (FAMA), or Lembaga Pemasaran Pertanian Persekutuan. (Official site)
 Fisheries Development Authority of Malaysia, or Lembaga Kemajuan Ikan Malaysia (LKIM). (Official site)
 Muda Agricultural Development Authority (MADA), or Lembaga Kemajuan Peladang Muda. (Official site)
 Malaysian Pineapple Industry Board (MPIB), or Lembaga Perindustrian Nanas Malaysia (LPNM). (Official site)
 Kemubu Agricultural Development Authority (KADA), or Lembaga Kemajuan Pertanian Kemubu. (Official site)
 Malaysian Bioeconomy Development Corp Sdn Bhd (Official site)
 Agrobank, or Bank Pertanian Malaysia Berhad. (Official site)

Fund for Food (3F) 
To increase food production in Malaysia and reduce food imports, Bank Negara Malaysia and Ministry of Agriculture both provide financing at a reasonable cost, with a minimum of RM10,000 funding.

Only Malaysian-owned institutions (at least 51% ownership) are eligible for the financing. (incorporated under the Companies Act 1965, the Co-operative Societies Act 1993, the Societies Act 1966, citizens residing in Malaysia and entrepreneurs registered under the Companies Commission of Malaysia or any other authoritative bodies)

Key legislation
The Ministry of Agriculture and Food Industries is responsible for administration of several key Acts:
 Malaysian Agricultural Research and Development Institute Act 1969
 Fisheries Act 1985

See also

Minister of Agriculture and Food Security (Malaysia)
Agriculture in Malaysia

References

External links

 Ministry of Agriculture and Food Industries
 

 
Federal ministries, departments and agencies of Malaysia
Ministries established in 2004
2004 establishments in Malaysia
Malaysia
Malaysia
Malaysia
Agricultural organisations based in Malaysia